The bibliography of American writer John Neal (1793–1876) spans more than sixty years from the War of 1812 through Reconstruction and includes novels, short stories, poetry, articles, plays, lectures, and translations published in newspapers, magazines, literary journals, gift books, pamphlets, and books. Favorite topics included women's rights, feminism, gender, race, slavery, children, education, law, politics, art, architecture, literature, drama, religion, gymnastics, civics, American history, science, phrenology, travel, language, political economy, and temperance.

Between 1817 and 1835, Neal became the first American published in British literary journals, author of the first history of American literature, the first American art critic, a children's literature pioneer, a forerunner of the American Renaissance, and one of the first American male advocates of women's rights. As the first American author to use natural diction and one of the first to write characters with regional American accents, Neal's fiction aligns with the literary nationalist and regionalist movements. A pioneer of colloquialism, Neal is the first to use the phrase son-of-a-bitch in an American work of fiction. His fiction explores the romantic and gothic genres.

Neal was a prolific contributor to periodicals, particularly in the second half of the 1830s. His critiques of literature, art, and drama anticipated future movements and contributed to the careers of many authors whose careers historically eclipsed Neal's. As a critic and political commentator, his essays and journalism showed distrust of institutions and an affinity for self-examination and self-reliance. Many of Neal's pamphlets are lectures he delivered between 1829 and 1848, when he supplemented his income by traveling on the lyceum circuit. He also published many short stories, averaging one per year in this time period. Neal's tales helped shape the genre and early children's literature and challenged socio-political phenomena associated with Jacksonian democracy. As a translator he worked mostly on French compositions but was able to read and write to some degree in eleven languages other than his native English. The bulk of his novels were published between 1822 and 1828 though he continued writing novels until the last decade of his life. His last major work was an 1874 guidebook for his hometown of Portland, Maine. There are four posthumous collections of his writing, published between 1920 and 1978.

Bound publications

Novels 
As a novelist, John Neal is recognized as "the first in America to be natural in his diction" and "the father of American subversive fiction" for developing a new "wild, rough, and defiant American style" to break with British standards then dominant in the US. A pioneer of American colloquialism and dialects in novels, Neal's novels are aligned with both the literary nationalist and regionalist movements and anticipate the American Renaissance.

Collections

Nonfiction books

Pamphlets 
Many of Neal's pamphlets are lectures he delivered between 1829 and 1848, when he supplemented his income by traveling on the lyceum circuit.

Collaborative works

Selected articles 

John Neal was "perhaps the foremost critic of [his] era", commenting on literature, art, drama, politics, and a variety of social issues. As a critic and political commentator, his essays and journalism showed distrust of institutions and an affinity for self-examination and self-reliance. Compared to Neal's comparative lesser success at employing his literary theories in creative works, "his critical judgments have held. Where he condemned, time has almost without exception condemned also." Editors of newspapers, magazines, and annual publications sought contributions from Neal on a wide variety of topics, particularly in the second half of the 1830s. His early articles make him one of the first male advocates of women's rights and feminist causes in the US.

Neal was the first American to be published in any British literary magazine and in that capacity wrote the first history of American literature. His early encouragement of writers John Greenleaf Whittier, Edgar Allan Poe, Henry Wadsworth Longfellow, Elizabeth Oakes Smith, Nathaniel Hawthorne, and many others, helped launch their careers. As an art critic Neal was the first in the US, and his essays from the 1820s are recognized as "prophetic". As an "early firebrand" in theatrical criticism, his "prophesy" for American drama was only partially realized sixty years later.

This list includes only articles that have received the most scholarly attention and/or that are noted in scholarly works as particularly important milestones in Neal's career and/or the histories of the topics they cover. Those omitted here are included in the larger list of articles by John Neal.

Short stories and fictional sketches
Called "the inventor of the American short story", John Neal's tales are "his highest literary achievement" and he published an average of one per year between 1828 and 1846. Many of them challenged American socio-political phenomena that grew in the period leading up to and including Andrew Jackson's terms as US president (1829–1837): manifest destiny, empire building, Indian removal, consolidation of federal power, racialized citizenship, and the Cult of Domesticity. His work helped shape the relatively new short story genre, particularly early children's literature.

Poems 
The bulk of Neal's poetry was published in The Portico while studying law in Baltimore in the late 1810s. By 1830 he had "acquired quite a reputation, especially as a poet", having been recognized in multiple poetry collections.

Other

Drama 
Neither of Neal's two fully conceived plays, nor his theatrical sketch, were ever produced for the stage.

Translations 
Neal was fluent in French and able to easily converse and write in Spanish, Italian, and German. In addition, he "could manage... pretty well" writing and reading Portuguese, Swedish, Danish, Hebrew, Latin, Greek, and Old Saxon. He learned to read Chinese shortly before his death.

Newspapers for which Neal wrote 
Neal started writing for newspapers as a law apprentice, publishing legal papers on capital punishment, lotteries, insolvency law, imprisonment for debt, and Sturges v. Crowninshield. These early works put him in the public eye nationally for the first time. Throughout his life he was widely recognized as a journalist and he continued publishing in newspapers until near the end of his life.

This list includes newspapers not listed elsewhere in this bibliography.

References

Citations

Sources
 
 
 
 
 
 
 
 
 
 
  In .
 
  In .
 
 
 
 
  In .
 
 
  In .
 
 
 
 
 
  In .
 
  In .

External links

 John Neal at Library of Congress Authorities
 
 Works by John Neal at Open Library
 Works by John Neal on the Online Books Page of the University of Pennsylvania Library

Bibliographies by writer
Bibliographies of American writers